Simu may refer to:

Sīmu or Samu, village in South Khorasan Province, Iran

People with the name
Simu Liu (born 1989), Chinese-born Canadian actor 
Anastase Simu (1854–1935), Romanian art collector
Ioan Simu (1875–1948), Romanian priest and politician 
Margareta Simu (born 1953), Swedish racewalker

Romanian-language surnames